The Ananga Ranga or Kamaledhiplava is an Indian sex manual written by Kalyana malla in the 15th or 16th century. The poet wrote the work in honor of Lad Khan, son of Ahmed Khan Lodi. He was related to the Lodi dynasty, which from 1451 to 1526 ruled from Delhi. Later commentators have said it is aimed specifically at preventing the separation of a husband and wife. This work is often compared to the Kama Sutra, on which it draws.

Overview 
It was translated into English in the year 1885, under the editorship of Sir Richard Francis Burton and subsequently burnt by his wife Isabel Burton in the weeks following his death.

"Satisfaction and enjoyment comes for a man with possession of a beautiful woman. Men marry because of the peaceful gathering, love, and comfort and they often get nice and attractive women. But the men do not give the women full satisfaction. The reason is due to the ignorance of the writings of the Kamashastra and the disdain of the different types of women. These men view women only from the perspective of an animal. They are foolish and spiritless".

The work was intended to show that a woman is enough for a man. The book provides instructions in how a husband can promote the love for his wife through sexual pleasure. The husband can so greatly enjoy living with his wife, that it is as if he had lived with 32 different women. The increasingly varied sexual pleasures are able to produce harmony, thus preventing the married couple from getting tired of one another. In addition to the extensive catalogue of sexual positions for both partners, there are details regarding foreplay and lure.

The contents of the chapters of Burton's translation of the Ananga Ranga are as follows:
 Chapter I: considers the four classes of women
 Chapter II: Of the Various Seats of Passion in Women
 Chapter III: Of the Different Kinds of Men and Women
 Chapter IV: Description of the General Qualities, Characteristics, Temperaments, Etc., of Women.
 Chapter V: Characteristics of the Women of Various Lands
 Chapter VI: Treating of Vashikarana
 Chapter VII: Of Different Signs in Men and Women
 Chapter VIII: Treating of External Enjoyments
 Chapter IX: Treating of Internal Enjoyments in Its Various Forms
 Appendix I: Astrology in Connection With Marriage
 Appendix II: (considers a variety of alchemical recipes, which are either potentially lethal, or completely ineffective as a remedy, or both)

References

External links 
 Text of the Burton translation of the Ananga Ranga
 Burton's translation of the Ananga Ranga in pdf format

Kamashastra
Sex manuals
Sexuality in India
15th-century books
16th-century books
Indian non-fiction books
Delhi Sultanate